Neophasia menapia, the pine white, is a butterfly in the family Pieridae. It is found in the western United States and in southern British Columbia, Canada.

It is mostly white with black veins and wing bars. The species is similar to Neophasia terlooii but their ranges only overlap in New Mexico.

Its habitats include pine forests and Douglas fir forests in northern coastal California. 

The host plants are Pinus species, Pseudotsuga menziesii, Tsuga heterophylla, Abies balsamea, Abies grandis, and Picea sitchensis. Adults feed on flower nectar from rabbitbrush, other yellow-flowered composites, and monarda. 

Neophasia menapia are a univoltine species that lay their eggs on live pine needles, as stated by a scientific research paper ("Phylogeography and the population genertics of pine butterflies") that details the differences between Neophasia.

Subspecies
Subspecies include: 
Neophasia menapia menapia
Neophasia menapia tau (Scudder, 1861)
Neophasia menapia melanica Scott, 1981
Neophasia menapia tehachapina Emmel, Emmel & Mattoon, 1998
Neophasia menapia megamenapia Austin, 1998

References

Neophasia
Butterflies of North America
Butterflies described in 1859
Taxa named by Baron Cajetan von Felder
Taxa named by Rudolf Felder